Best Friend, also known as Good Neighbor is a 2020 South Korean comedy-drama film directed by Lee Hwan-kyung. The film starring Jung Woo, Oh Dal-soo, Kim Hee-won, Kim Byung-chul, Lee Yu-bi, Jo Hyeon-cheol, Ji Seung-hyun, Kim Sun-kyung and Yeom Hye-ran. It was released theatrically on November 25, 2020.

Cast
 Jung Woo as Yoo Dae-kwon
 Oh Dal-soo as Lee Ui-sik
 Kim Hee-won as Chief Kim
 Kim Byung-chul as Dong-sik
 Lee Yu-bi as Lee Eun-jin
 Jo Hyeon-cheol as Young-cheol
 Ji Seung-hyun as Dong-hyuk
 Kim Sun-kyung as Young-ja
 Yeom Hye-ran

References

External links
 
 
 

2020 comedy-drama films
2020s political comedy-drama films
2020s Korean-language films
South Korean comedy-drama films
South Korean political comedy films
South Korean political drama films
Films about democracy
Films about human rights
Films about ideologies
Films about politicians
Films about presidents
Films about security and surveillance
Films set in Seoul
Films set in 1985
Films set in the 1980s
Films shot in North Chungcheong Province
Films shot in South Jeolla Province
Little Big Pictures films